Narendra Mohan (born 30 July 1935, in Lahore) is a Hindi author, poet and playwright.

Biography
He has published twelve collections of poems, Nine plays, Thirteen books of literary criticism and Twenty edited books on various themes and genres. His poems, plays and critical articles have been translated into Punjabi, Urdu, Marathi, English, Telugu, Kannada and other Indian languages.

Mohan got his PhD in Modern Hindi Poetry (Adhunik Hindi Kavita Mein Aprastut Vidhan) at Panjab University in 1966. A number of poems and articles appeared starting 1954 and by 1960, he was well known in literary circles.

References 

Indian male dramatists and playwrights
1935 births
Hindi-language writers
Hindi-language poets
Indian literary critics
Punjabi academics
Punjabi-language poets
Punjabi-language writers
Living people